Daniel "Dani" Albiar Serrano (born 8 January 2000) is a Spanish footballer who plays as an attacking midfielder for FC Cartagena B, on loan from UD Almería.

Club career
Born in Cartagena, Region of Murcia, Albiar joined UD Almería's youth setup in 2013, at the age of 13. He made his senior debut with the reserves on 22 October 2017, coming on as a second-half substitute for Sergio Pérez and scoring the equalizer in a 1–1 Tercera División home draw against CD Huétor Vega.

Albiar made his first team debut for the Rojiblancos on 19 December 2019, replacing José Romera in the extra time in a 2–3 away loss against UD Tamaraceite, for the season's Copa del Rey. His Segunda División debut occurred the following 26 January, after coming on for fellow youth graduate Iván Martos in a 0–2 home loss against Elche CF.

On 31 August 2021, Albiar moved to Primera División RFEF side CD Alcoyano on a one-year loan deal. The following 4 January, after making no appearances for the side, he moved to FC Cartagena's reserves in Tercera División RFEF, also in a temporary deal.

Albiar scored an extra-time winner in Cartagena B's promotion match against CD Quintanar del Rey on 22 May 2022, and had his loan was extended for the 2022–23 season on 11 July.

References

External links

2000 births
Living people
Sportspeople from Cartagena, Spain
Spanish footballers
Footballers from the Region of Murcia
Association football midfielders
Segunda División players
Segunda División B players
Tercera División players
Tercera Federación players
UD Almería B players
UD Almería players
CD Alcoyano footballers
FC Cartagena B players